Robert et Robert is a film directed by Claude Lelouch.

Synopsis
Two single men apply to a dating agency. To start with, they are intimidated, but come round to the idea. That night, they imagine the meetings that will change their lives forever.

Starring
Charles Denner : Robert Goldman
Jacques Villeret : Robert Villiers
Jean-Claude Brialy : M. Millet
Francis Perrin : M. Michaud
Germaine Montero : Goldman's mother
Régine : Villiers's mother
Macha Méril : Agathe
Nella Bielski : Mme Millet
Patricia Cartier
Josette Derrenne : Mme Michaud
Arlette Emmery : Arlette
Mohamed Zinet : Ali
Bruno Coquatrix : Himself

Awards
César Awards 1979 : Best supporting actor for Jacques Villeret

References

External links

1978 films
Films directed by Claude Lelouch
French comedy films
1970s French-language films
Films scored by Francis Lai
1970s French films